Albatros is a sailing ketch built in the Netherlands in 1899. Trading as a cargo sailing ship until 1996, she is now used as a training vessel.

List of owners

History

1899-1980
Albatros was built at Capelle aan den IJssel in the Netherlands in 1899 as a Noordzee Klipper (North Sea cutter) or Galliot. Her first captain was Johannes Muller of Middelharnis, South Holland, who used her to transport cargo between the Netherlands and the Baltic states. In 1920, Albatros was sold to Captain Lolk from Svendborg, Denmark, who installed an 80 hp engine in 1933. In 1941, Lolk sold her to Captain Rasmussen from Hobro. During the Second World War, Albatros was used to smuggle Jews and political dissidents from Nazi-occupied Denmark to neutral Sweden. Weapons for the Danish resistance were also smuggled back into Denmark on the return journey.

Her rigging was reduced in 1964 and the rivetted steel below the waterline replaced with welded steel. A more powerful 160 hp engine replaced the old 80 hp engine. Rasmussen retired in 1978, and Albatros was laid up in Copenhagen.

Since 1980
In 1980, Antonius "Ton" Brouwer bought Albatros, and made Amsterdam her new home port. She was restored under Germanischer Lloyd supervision between 1983 and 1987 and recommissioned as a sailing cargo ship. Her first cargo after restoration was soya beans to Macduff, Scotland.

Between 1987 and 1996, she could often be seen at Wells-next-the-Sea delivering her regular cargos of soya beans. With the closure of Wells as a commercial port in 1996, Albatros'''s career as a cargo ship was finally over. The final load of 100 tons of soya beans were delivered on 5 September 1996. At the time it was claimed that she was the last sailing ship carrying commercial cargo in Europe. During this time, her cargos also included corn, phosphates and timber. Apart from the regular run between Ghent and Wells, Albatros visited ports in  the Channel Islands, Denmark, England, Estonia, Finland, Germany, Norway, Poland, Scotland and Sweden, sometimes making faster passages than motor driven ships.Albatros was converted to a passenger ship in 1997-98. Between 1998 and 2000, she was chartered and rebuilt by Greenpeace and used as a sailing classroom in an environmental education program. In 2001, she returned to Wells, and The Albatros Project was created to support her upkeep. The ship established a programme of passenger and training voyages as well as private charters and events at Wells. While on the Thames Estuary on 22 August 2004, a passenger on board Albatros died when he fell from the rigging. An investigation was carried out by the Marine Accident Investigation Branch, which found shortcomings in the regulatory requirements for foreign passenger vessels operating in the UK, as well as in the safety management regime and manning of Albatros.

From 2005, sailing trips were gradually replaced by the development of the ship as a bar, restaurant, music venue and bed and breakfast at her Wells berth.

References

 External links 
 HTML version of MAIB report.
 Scale model of the Albatros''.
 The Albatros current home page

Passenger ships of the Netherlands
Tall ships of the Netherlands
Sailing ships of the Netherlands
Merchant ships of the Netherlands
1899 ships
World War II merchant ships of Denmark
Wells-next-the-Sea
Bed and breakfasts